Kuganak (also Romanized as Kūgānak, Kowgānak, and Kowgonak; also known as Darreh-ye Gūgānak, Darreh-ye Kowgānak, Gūgānak-e ‘Olyā, Kaugunak, Kogānak, Kowkānak, and Kowkūnak) is a village in Chenarud-e Jonubi Rural District, Chenarud District, Chadegan County, Isfahan Province, Iran. At the 2006 census, its population was 25, in 5 families.

References 

Populated places in Chadegan County